Dr. Lillian Aber is the women's representative for Kitgum District in the eleventh Parliament of Uganda. She represented the National Resistance Movement under re-elected President of Uganda, Yoweri Museveni. In the 2021 general election, Dr.Aber won with 41,192 votes against Roselyn Alanyo Olobo of the Uganda People's Congress and Norah Odokorach, an independent candidate.

Education 
Dr.Aber earned a bachelor's degree in English Language and communication skills from Makerere University. She also earned an MBA from Uganda Christian University Another Master’s Degree in public Administration and management from(Makerere University) Aber also holds an Honorary PhD from Zoe life theoretical college in USA.

Career 
Dr.Aber's involvement in politics began at Makerere University. As a freshman, she won the election to become Guild Representative Councillor (GRC) of the School of Arts in the College of Humanities and Social Sciences. She was then appointed as a Guild Minister by the Guild President, Anna Ebaju Adeke that year. As a sophomore, she stood for the guild presidency on the Forum For Democratic Change party ticket, but lost to Bwowe Ivan, who later appointed her as Guild Vice President.

While Guild Vice President, she made a bid for the presidency of the Uganda National Students Union (UNSA) which she won in 2015, replacing Matanda Abubaker (the UNSA President from 2013 to 2014).  Aber later moved from the Forum For Democratic Change party to the National Resistance Movement party when standing for the position of Chairperson of the National Youth Council. She was elected to this position in November 2015, polling 119 votes ahead of George Abudul who polled 105 votes.

Dr.Aber is now a senior presidential advisor on youth and a UN youth delegate. Aber also is a former Commonwealth students association representative in charge of partnerships and advocacy. In  2018, Aber joined the Uganda constitutional review team. In 2016 she had unsuccessfully stood for the East African Legislative Assembly(EALA).

In January 2021, Aber won the women's representative seat for Kitgum District. She replaced Margaret Lamwaka Odwar who switched to the Chua East Constituency.

She is also the founder and director of Laber Foundation a Non governmental charity Organization based in Kitgum.

References 

Living people
Makerere University alumni
Uganda Christian University alumni
Year of birth missing (living people)
21st-century Ugandan politicians

IS she married  ??